Fritillaria glauca is a species of fritillary known by the common names Siskiyou fritillary and Siskiyou missionbells.

It is native to northern California, USA (as far south as Lake County) and southern Oregon (as far north as Lane County), where it is found in the serpentine talus on the slopes of the local mountains.

Description
It is sometimes stunted-looking with a curled or warped stem; it often grows in exposed mountainous areas. The flower is nodding and has six thick tepals 1–2 cm long. They are yellow to purple and densely mottled. The fruits are winged.

References

External links
Jepson Manual Treatment
Calphotos Photo gallery color photos
Turner Photographics, Liliaceae Fritillaria glauca Siskiyou Fritillary color photos
Fritillaries: The Genus Fritillaria West of the Cascade Mountains of Oregon and Washington, Siskiyou Fritillary Fritillaria glauca color photos

glauca
Flora of California
Plants described in 1893
Flora of Oregon
Natural history of Siskiyou County, California
Flora without expected TNC conservation status